Kempes is a surname. Notable people with the surname include:

 Mario Kempes (born 1954), Argentine footballer
 Estadio Mario Alberto Kempes, stadium named after him
 Edwin Kempes (born 1976), Dutch tennis player
 Kempes (1982–2016), born Everton Kempes dos Santos Gonçalves, Brazilian footballer